Victor Matheus da Silva Matos (born 4 January 1995) is a Brazilian footballer who plays as an attacking midfielder for Cypriot club Olympiakos Nicosia.

Club career 
Born in Cuiabá, Victor da Silva played youth football with São Caetano before moving to Chievo in the 2010 summer. On 19 May 2013 he made his first-team debut, coming on as a second-half substitute in a 2–2 draw at Atalanta.
In the 2014–15 season, he played in Serie B for Pescara, scoring two goals. In January 2016, Da Silva moved on loan to Brescia until the end of the season.

On 4 December Victor da Silva scored his first goal, the last of a 4–1 home routing over Reggina, for the campaign's Coppa Italia.

On 15 January 2019, he joined Fano on loan. For the 2019–20 season, he moved to Virtus Verona.

In August 2020, da Silva moved to Albanian club KF Vllaznia Shkodër.

Honours
Campionato Nazionale Primavera: 2013-2014

References

External links 

1995 births
Living people
Brazilian footballers
Brazilian expatriate footballers
Association football midfielders
People from Cuiabá
A.C. ChievoVerona players
Delfino Pescara 1936 players
Brescia Calcio players
S.S. Teramo Calcio players
NK Istra 1961 players
A.C. Perugia Calcio players
Lupa Roma F.C. players
Fermana F.C. players
Alma Juventus Fano 1906 players
Virtus Verona players
KF Vllaznia Shkodër players
Olympiakos Nicosia players
Serie A players
Serie B players
Serie C players
Brazilian expatriate sportspeople in Italy
Brazilian expatriate sportspeople in Croatia
Brazilian expatriate sportspeople in Albania
Expatriate footballers in Italy
Expatriate footballers in Croatia
Expatriate footballers in Albania
Sportspeople from Mato Grosso